The term Palestinian Civil War may refer to:

 Military conflict in British Palestine:
Intercommunal conflict in Mandatory Palestine
1947–48 Civil War in Mandatory Palestine

 Military conflict in the Gaza Strip:
Fatah–Hamas conflict
2009 Hamas political violence in Gaza

See also
 Palestinian conflict (disambiguation)